Rodeillo is a village located 25 kilometers from Pichilemu, in central Chile.

The village has a water mill built in 1952 by countryman José Elizardo Muñoz Vargas; it has become a touristic attraction.

References

Populated places in Pichilemu